Eupithecia albiceps is a moth in the  family Geometridae. It is found in Peru.

References

Moths described in 1905
albiceps
Moths of South America